Michael Levin  is professor of paediatrics and international child health at Imperial College London.

References 

Living people
Year of birth missing (living people)
Pediatricians
Academics of Imperial College London
Members of the Order of the British Empire
NIHR Senior Investigators